The Llobregat is the second longest river in Catalonia, Spain, after the Ter. It flows into the Mediterranean south of the city of Barcelona. Its name could have originated in an ancient Latin word meaning 'dark', 'sorrowful' or 'muddy', or from Rubricatus, "red."

Course

At Martorell, the Roman Via Augusta crosses the river on the impressive Devil's bridge, which dates from the High Middle Ages in its current form. The C-16 highway is also known as the 'Llobregat Axis' for its largest stretch follows the valley of the Llobregat.

The river ends in the Mediterranean Sea forming the Llobregat Delta, in the municipality of El Prat de Llobregat, near Barcelona on the left bank. The delta provided a large extension of fertile land close to the city of Barcelona, but is now largely paved, urbanized and covered by infrastructure such as the Barcelona–El Prat international Airport.

The Llobregat is heavily managed in its lower course and water that was previously lost to the sea is now pumped upstream to increase the natural flow, recharge the river delta wetlands and control seawater incursion.

Tributaries
The main tributaries of the Llobregat are:
Right tributaries:
Bastareny
Cardener
Anoia
Left tributaries:
Riera de Merlès
Riera Gavarresa
Riera de Rubí
Riera de Vallvidrera, also known as la Rierada

See also 
 List of rivers of Spain
 Baix Llobregat
 Besòs (river)

References

Further reading
 S. Sabater & A. Ginebreda & D. Barceló (Editors):  The Llobregat: The Story of a Polluted Mediterranean River. Springer, 2012.

External links

 River Llobregat Water Reclamation Project

Rivers of Spain
Drainage basins of the Balearic Sea
Rivers of Catalonia